An unconstituted locality is a specific type of designated place in Quebec, a small community that has not been constituted as a municipality (Quebec uses the term "constituted" rather than "incorporated").

Designated places are defined by provinces and territories of Canada in cooperation with Statistics Canada, and Quebec has two kinds: dissolved municipalities and unconstituted localities.  Dissolved municipalities are often the result of mergers and amalgamations (see Municipal history of Quebec and :Category:Former municipalities in Quebec), and in some cases Statistics Canada chooses to keep tracking population and other figures for census purposes over the territory of the pre-merger municipality.  However, unconstituted localities never had the status of municipality to begin with.

An unconstituted locality will necessarily exist on the territory of some municipality (or unorganized territory).

Unconstituted localities

 Kegashka is sometimes also written Kegaska.
 La Romaine should not be confused with Unamen Shipu, the neighbouring Indian reserve of the same name 
 The unconstituted locality of Saint-Jean-de-Dieu should not be confused with the municipality of Saint-Jean-de-Dieu, within which it lies.

External links
 Statistics Canada: Census Profile (2011): Subprovincial geography levels: Quebec

 
Lists of populated places in Quebec